The BMW E34 is the third generation of the BMW 5 Series, which was produced from November 2, 1987, until 1996. Initially launched as a sedan in January 1988, the E34 also saw a "Touring" station wagon (estate) body style added in September 1992, a first for the 5 Series. BMW replaced the E34 with the E39 5 Series in December 1995, although E34 Touring models remained in production until June 1996.

The E34 generation marked the first time all-wheel drive was incorporated into the 5 Series with the 525iX, and the first V8 engine to be used in a 5 Series. The E34 also saw the introduction of stability control (ASC), traction control (ASC+T) a 6-speed manual transmission and adjustable damping (EDC) to the 5 Series range.

There was an unusually large range of engines fitted over its lifetime as nine different engine families were used. These consisted of straight-four, straight-six and V8 engines.

The E34 M5 is powered by the S38 straight-six engine and was produced in sedan and wagon body styles.

Development and launch 
Development ran from July 1981 to early 1987, with the initial design proposal penned by Ercole Spada in 1982. Under the guidance of chief designer Claus Luthe, BMW based much of the design on the E32 7 Series. Following Spada's departure from BMW and styling approval in 1983, J Mays finalized the design for production in mid-1985. Special attention was paid to aerodynamics, with the E34 basic sedan having a drag coefficient of 0.30.

Series production began in November 1987. In December 1987, the E34 sedan was unveiled to global press.

Body styles 

Engines 
Official output figures are as follows:

Petrol

Diesel

Drivetrain

Manual transmissions 
 5-speed Getrag 260
 5-speed Getrag 280 — 3.6 L M5 model only
 5-speed ZF S5D 310 — 91-92 US, and European M50 engines
 5-speed Getrag 250G - 93-95 US M50 engines.
 6-speed Getrag 420G — 540i and 1994-1996 M5 only

Automatic transmissions 
 4-speed ZF 4HP22 - M20 and M30 engines
 4-speed GM 4L30-E (A4S 310R) - M50 engines (US only)
 5-speed ZF 5HP18 - M50 and M51 (except US) and 1992-1995 530i (M60B30).
 5-speed ZF 5HP30 - 540i

Suspension 
Front suspension consists of double pivot MacPherson struts, with a replaceable shock absorber cartridge inside a steel strut housing. Control arms and thrust arms control front-to-back and side-to-side movement. Steering on most models is a recirculating ball design, however the all-wheel drive 525iX uses a rack and pinion steering system (along with front suspension) similar to the E30 3 Series 325iX model. All front suspension components are steel, except that the lower control arms on some models are aluminum.

Rear suspension consists of semi-trailing arms with coil springs integrated in a strut assembly.

Models

Petrol-engined 
The base model, available only in Europe, was the petrol-powered four-cylinder 518i. Only available with a 5-speed manual transmission, a total of 53,248 cars were produced.

The next petrol model up was the six-cylinder 520i, which began production in January 1988. It was initially powered by the BMW M20 single overhead camshaft engine, which was replaced by the BMW M50 double overhead camshaft engine in 1990. The 520i was the second most popular E34 model globally, with 426,971 units produced. The 525i was the most popular E34 model globally with 434,549 units produced. As per the 520i, the 525i initially used the M20 engine, which was replaced by the M50 engine in 1990.

Engine volume and year of manufacture often influenced the type of wiring. This was of great importance for decoding the configuration and the possibility of further retrofitting. Thus, cars can be divided into two types: high and low. Wiring had a big influence to the amount of possible options and functions of a car. There also was update after M50 and M60 introduce.

A rare E34 model is the petrol-powered six-cylinder 525iX, of which only 9,366 cars were produced. The 525iX was the first all-wheel drive 5 Series, and the only all-wheel drive model in the E34 range. It was powered by the BMW M50 engine and was the first 5 Series to use a rack and pinion steering system.

There are two versions of the E34 530i: an inline-six model produced from 1988 to 1990, and a V8 model produced from 1993 to 1995. The earlier model was one of the last applications of the BMW M30 inline-six engine. The V8 version, which replaced the six-cylinder 535i in the lineup, was powered by the new BMW M60 V8 engine and was available with a 5-speed manual or 5-speed automatic transmission. Initially, the V8 models were differentiated from other models by the wide grill; in 1994 the wide grill became available on other models. Between the two versions of the 530i, a total of 57,570 cars were produced.

The highest six-cylinder model (except for the M5) was the 535i. There was also a 535i Sport model with M-technic body kit, boot spoiler with brake light, sport seats, M-Tech sports leather steering wheel (M-tech 1 for 1988-1989 cars, M-tech 2 for 1990–1992), M-technic suspension (M-tech springs, stiffer shocks, M-tech 25mm front stabilizer bar, M-tech 18mm rear stabilizer bar), a polished rocker cover and also a limited-slip differential (25% lock) as standard. A total of 97,679 cars were produced, including the Alpina B10 (BiTurbo, 3.5) models. The 535i was replaced by the V8-engined 530i and 540i models in 1993.

In 1993, the 540i model was added to the top of the 5 Series lineup, powered by the BMW M60 V8 engine and available in both sedan and wagon body styles (the latter not in US). Transmission options were a 6-speed manual or a 5-speed automatic. A total of 26,485 units were produced. Initially, the V8 models were differentiated from other models by the wider grilles. In 1994 the wide grilles became available on other models as well.

Diesel-engined 
The first diesel model was the 524td, which was introduced in 1988. This model was replaced by the 525tds in 1991, and a lower-specification 525td was introduced in 1993. Only the 525tds model was fitted with an intercooler.

North America 
In the United States, the E34 model range was launched in October 1988 with the 525i and 535i 6-cylinder models (for the 1989 model year). Over the course of the E34 generation, the 525i Touring, 530i, 530i Touring, 540i and M5 models were sold in the United States. The  version of the M5 remained in production until 1993, by which time the  version was being produced for other countries.

M5 model 

Introduced in September 1988 and produced until August 1995, the E34 M5 was produced in both sedan and station wagon ('Touring') body styles, the latter being the first M5 to be available as a wagon.

This 3.8 litre version of the M5 was first seen by the public at the 1991 Frankfurt Motor Show, where the E34 M5 Touring also saw its debut.

In its last year of production for the M5, the transmission was upgraded from a 5-speed manual to the Getrag 420G 6-speed manual (which was also used by the 540i model).

Special models

518g 
A model which could run on natural gas (as well as petrol) and was only sold in Germany. The 518g was based on the 518i Touring model and the only transmission available was a 5-speed manual. The engine, also used by the 1995-2000 3 Series Compact 316g model, was a re-tuned version of the BMW M43 four-cylinder engine. When running on natural gas, the engine produced , compared with  when running on petrol. It was only produced in 1995 and just 298 units were built.

518iev prototype 
After unveiling the BMW E1 and E2 concept car electric vehicles in 1992, BMW began a project to show it was possible to make a full-sized electric car, despite the obstacle of the weight of the lead-acid battery technology at the time. The batteries were a lead-acid type and the electric motors used a rotating-field AC electric drive. To assist the electric drivetrain, the 518iev also had a four-cylinder petrol engine and a continuously variable transmission, a configuration similar to the first production hybrid cars produced by other manufacturers several years later. BMW built at least one fully functional E34 prototype, which was tested in the late 1990s by Deutsche Post and others.

540i M-sport / M540i / 540i LE 

Because the M5 was discontinued for non-European markets in 1993, the 540i M-Sport model was built in 1995 for the North American market. On top of the regular 540i features, additional features included sports suspension equipped with EDC, bolstered sport seats, servotronic steering, and US-spec M5 brakes. 205 "M-Sport" models were built, 139 of them with the 6-speed manual transmission.

An M540i model was produced for in Canada. It includes the features of the North American 540i M-sport, plus upgraded Euro-spec M5 brakes, 18-inch M-parallel wheels, and various trim pieces. Only 32 of these cars were built, all with a manual transmission.

The 540i LE (i.e. Limited Edition) sedan was sold in Australia and the United Kingdom. The 540i LE included the interior from the M5, "throwing star" M-System II wheels, EDC suspension with self leveling rear, Servotronic power steering, and front air dam. 70 of these 540i LE sedans were produced, all with a manual transmission, each individually numbered using an engraved metal plaque stuck onto the centre console beneath the handbrake lever.

Alpina models

B10 3.0 AllRad 
This model is based on the 525iX with an enlarged 3 litre engine producing 231bhp instead of 192bhp. Between 1993 and 1996 64 saloon cars and 70 Touring cars were produced by the Alpina factory in Buchloe with a very small number of right hand drive cars, 2 saloons and 1 Touring, converted by Sytner, the Alpina Dealer in Nottingham, England.

B10 3.5 
This model is based on the 535i with a modified 3.5 litre engine producing 254bhp instead of 220bhp. Between 1988 and 1992 572 left hand drive cars were made in Buchloe, with perhaps 30 or so right hand converted by Sytner.  The B10 3.5 was only supplied as a saloon car and no Touring cars were made.

B10 4.0 
This model is based on the 540i with a modified 4 litre engine producing 315bhp instead of 286bhp. Between 1993 and 1995 45 saloon cars and 4 Touring cars were produced by Buchloe, all left hand drive, with a further two right hand drive saloon cars converted by Sytner.

B10 4.6 
This model is based on the 540i with an Alpina designed 4.6 litre engine which was used also in the E36 Alpina B8 4.6. Between 1994 and 1996 27 saloon cars and 19 Touring cars were produced by Buchloe, all left hand drive except one right hand drive Touring car. With 7bhp more than the B8 4.6 (due to the larger exhaust manifold) it produces the same 340bhp as the E34 3.8 M5 Touring but with nearly 20% more torque. It was also available in right hand drive unlike the M5 Touring.

B10 BiTurbo 

The B10 BiTurbo was based on a very modified 535i and was introduced in March 1989 after a $3.2million investment in R&D. Despite being nearly twice the price of a BMW M5 it sold tremendously well and production ceased in 1995 after 507 saloon models were made, and only after BMW ceased producing the M30 engine upon which the engine was based. It was not available in right hand drive due to the turbo-chargers placement or ever made as a Touring model. It produced 360bhp and 375lb/ft of torque on full boost, just 20bhp and 21lb/ft more than the B10 4.6. Along with the Lotus/Omega Carlton it was considered one of the fastest saloon cars in the world.

Model year changes 
BMW E34 had no facelift as such. All updates were introduced gradually and sometimes were country specific. Most changes occur in September each year, when the changes for the following model year go into production, as is typical BMW practice. Therefore, the changes for 1988 represent the 1989 model year, for example.

1988 
 M5 model introduced
 524td diesel model introduced
 518i four-cylinder model introduced
 Driver's side airbag introduced

1989 
 520i engine updated to the BMW M50, the first model to use the new twin-cam straight-six engine

1990 
 525i engine updated to the BMW M50 in some markets, 1991 in others.
 525iX all-wheel drive model introduced
 525tds diesel model introduced

1991 
 525i engine updated to the BMW M50 in the US market.
 Touring (station wagon/estate models) introduced: 520iT and 525iT.
 Leather seat stitching pattern changed from double to single.
 Steering columns and wheels changed from E30-compatible (22mm nut) to E36-compatible (16mm bolt).
New interior (wooden decor)

1992 
 520i and 525i engines updated to the BMW M50TU, which added variable valve timing (VANOS)
 V8 engines introduced in the 530i and 540i models. The V8 models adopted a wider grille than other models.
 M5 engine enlarged from 3.6 litres to 3.8 litres
 Revised exterior mirrors and hubcaps
 Revised interior electrics, primarily with central locking. General Modules were black on early cars, green on later, and not interchangeable.
 525i manual transmission changed from ZF 310Z to Getrag 250G, US market only.

1993 
 525td diesel model introduced
 Last year for 535i six-cylinder model, marking the end of the 24-year production run of the M30 engine
 6-speed manual transmission available for 540i model (the first 6-speed manual available in a 5 Series), non-US markets.
 ASC became available

1994 
 518i engine upgraded from BMW M40 to BMW M43
 M5 transmission upgraded from 5-speed manual to 6-speed manual
 Wider grille (previously used for V8 models only) became available for other models, non-US markets.
 US-market Touring models no longer equipped with self-leveling suspension as standard.
 EWS 1 drive-away protection used in some models.

1995 
 All models equipped with wider grill and body-colour lower body trim (US market).
 Interior materials revised: steering wheel slightly different design with colour emblem, door cards ruched/gathered leather and with different glue (more durable between panel and its vinyl/leather covering, less durable between panel and mounting clips). 
 EWS drive-away protection updated to EWS 2.
 540i available with 6-speed manual transmission for the US market, all with Sport seats and suspension.
 540i automatic and manual models equipped with 2.93 final drive, previously 2.81 (US market, at least).

Production 
Production of the E34 commenced on November 2, 1987, for the 535i, with 535i market launch being in January 1988 and other variants following a staggered launch. 520i and 530i production began in January 1988, for March 1988 market launch. Production of the 525i began in February 1988, being launched to market in April 1988, with the 524td entering production in March 1988 for May 1988 introduction. Touring production began in November 1990. Production ended for the sedan in December 1995 and Touring in June 1996.

The production plants for the E34 were the Dingolfing plant in Germany and Rosslyn in South Africa. Total production was 1,333,412 units.

References

External links

5 Series
Cars introduced in 1987
1990s cars
Cars discontinued in 1996